The Bangladesh Ansar (also known as the Ansar Bahini) is a paramilitary auxiliary force responsible for the preservation of internal security and law enforcement in Bangladesh. It is administered by the Ministry of Home Affairs of the Government of Bangladesh. It is the world's largest single paramilitary force with 6.1 million active and reserved members.

History

The name originates from the Arabic word of "Ansar", which denotes a "volunteer". The Ansar  were the local inhabitants of Medina who, in Islamic tradition, took the Islamic prophet Muhammad and his followers (the Muhajirun) into their homes when they emigrated from Mecca during the hijra.

The Ansar force was formed as the "East Pakistan Ansars" by the East Pakistan Ansars Act of 1948, and officially launched on 12 February 1948. The first director of the Ansar was James Buchanan, a British official appointed by the government of then-Chief Minister of East Bengal Khawaja Nazimuddin. The force was placed under the administration of the home ministry of the province of East Bengal (later known as East Pakistan).

The emphasis was on recruiting in border areas, where Ansars were deployed to interdict smuggling and prevent emigrants from taking valuables out of the country illegally. The force grew quickly. By early 1949 there were 118,000 Ansars. During the Indo-Pakistani War of 1965, the Ansar were deployed to the border areas along with the East Pakistan Rifles to support the Pakistani army.

Bangladesh War of Liberation 
During the Bangladesh War of Liberation of 1971, some of the Ansar joined the Bangladesh Forces guerrillas to fight against the Pakistani army while most remained loyal to Pakistan army and committed atrocities. 12 Ansar members presented a guard of honour to the Bangladesh government in exile at 8 Theatre road on 17 April 1971. As a result, the Ansars were disbanded by the Pakistani government.

Post-independence 
After the independence of Bangladesh, the force was reconstituted as the Bangladesh Ansar. The Ansar were given fresh importance by the government of President Ziaur Rahman, which designated the Ansar as the "people's defence force" and formed Ansar battalions.

Raising of Ansar battalions
In 1976, 20 Battalions of Ansar were raised in line with the Armed Police Battalions to augment the strength of the security forces. At present, there are 38 Male and 2 Female Ansar Battalions deployed all over the country. Battalion Ansars are mainly deployed in Chittagong Hill Tracts (CHTs) for Counter Insurgency Operations (CIO) and south-western region of the country for Counter Terrorism Operations.

1994 mutiny and reforms 
In 1994, a mutiny against low pay and unfair treatment was suppressed by the Bangladesh Rifles. This prompted a series of reforms by successive governments including the Ansar Bahini Act (1995), Battalion Ansar Act (1995) and the Village Defence Party Act (1995). Under these Acts, the Ansar Bahini and the Battalion Ansars were declared a "Disciplined Force" in accordance with article 152 of the Constitution. The government also set up "Ansar VDP Unnayan Bank" where the members of Ansar-VDP members were entitled to loans and shares.

In 1998, Bangladesh Ansar and VDP were awarded the National Standard, and in 2004 it was awarded the Independence Award. The service of battalion Ansars was under National Pay Scale in October 2008, and they were entitled to family rations and combat uniform. In 2006, the role of Ansar- VDP was expanded to fight rising militancy. In 2016, the Ansar Striking Force, a 300 strong elite unit, was created to provide security to diplomats.

Role
The stated missions of Ansar are: 
To assist Government or Any Authority under Government in matters of Public Security ;
To take part in any public welfare activities as per the Government's instructions to improve socio-economic conditions of the country.
To assist Law Enforcement agencies in metropolitan and industrial security.
To assist Bangladesh Armed Forces in national defense during war;
To provide security to national VIPs, CIPs and diplomats as per the Government's instructions.
To take part in any disaster management activities as per the Government's instructions.

The members of Ansar also participate in education expansion programs, tree plantation, population control, women's empowerment, and sanitation activities.

Organization
At present there are three branches of Ansar Bahini 1. General Ansar. 2. Battalion Ansar. 3. Village Defense Force. Their combined draw is over 6 million which is the largest force in the world as a paramilitary or single force.

The Ansar is headed by a director-general, who also heads the Village Defence Party (VDPs).

Director General
Director General of Bangladesh Ansar (abbreviated as BD Ansar) also known as 'Ansar and VDP Chief' is the professional head of the Bangladesh Ansar. The current DG is Major General AKM Aminul Haque.

The Director General  functions from the Bangladesh Ansar Headquarters, which is located in the Khilgaon, Dhaka.

Headquarters 
The headquarters of the Ansar is located in Khilgaon, Dhaka and the training facilities are located at the Bangladesh Ansar & VDP Academy in Shafipur, Gazipur, north of the national capital, Dhaka.

Equipment

References

Organizations established in 1948
Law enforcement in Bangladesh
Bangladesh
Non-military counterterrorist organizations
Non-military counterinsurgency organizations